Cagliari is the main railway station of the Italian city of Cagliari, the capital of Sardinia. It is owned by the Ferrovie dello Stato, the national rail company of Italy, and is the most important station of its region. The station is sometimes unofficially named Cagliari Centrale and Cagliari Piazza Matteotti. This second name is due to the station's position on Giacomo Matteotti Square.

History
The station was inaugurated in July 1879, as terminus of the central Sardinian line to Oristano, Ozieri and Olbia. In 1893 it was linked to the port for freight traffic. In the late 1980s, due to the construction of a second track on the Cagliari-Decimomannu line, the station was renovated and a fourth platform (to host a total of 8 passenger tracks) was built.

Structure and transport
Cagliari station is located in the middle of the city and counts a railway depot 200 m in the north and parallel to the line. The station building has three floors and, at the top, a sculpture representing the coat of arms of the city and the inscription "FERROVIE DELLO STATO".

The station, which like the other stations in Sardinia is not electrified, is served by regional trains linking it to almost all the island towns, excluding some as Nuoro or Alghero.

Other station
Cagliari had a separate railway station, for Ferrovie della Sardegna (FdS), at Piazza della Repubblica. However, in 2008, the FdS line from Mandas was cut back to Monserrato, and the track beyond was taken over by trams of the Cagliari light rail system.

Photogallery

See also
Trolleybuses in Cagliari
Sassari railway station
Railway stations in Italy
List of railway stations in Sardinia
Rail transport in Italy
History of rail transport in Italy

Notes and references

External links

Railway stations in Sardinia
Railway Station
Railway stations opened in 1879